Dr. Ali Hussein Salman Hajjaj (1933–2004) was the first non-English speaking person to acquire a (Ph.D.) in Applied Linguistics of the English Language. He attained his Ph.D. from Department of Linguistics and English Language of the University of Lancaster, UK in 1979.

The late Dr. Ali was born in Gaza Palestine, in 1933. He acquired the Canadian citizenship in 1995. He died in the city of Amman, Jordan, while he was on top of his academic assignment as the Head of English Department at the Faculty of Arts at Petra University, Jordan.

Dr. Hajjaj contributed to English Language Teaching (ELT) to native English language speakers as well as English as a Second Language (ESL) and English as a Foreign Language (EFL).

Education
He received his graduate, B.A. in English Literature from Cairo University, Egypt in 1955.

His M.A. (Master's degree) in  Applied Linguistics from University of Lancaster, Lancaster, UK in 1973.
The Title of M.A. Thesis was "A Suggested Approach to a Functional Syllabus for ELT".

He received his Ph.D. (doctoral degree) in applied linguistics, from the University of Lancaster, Lancaster, UK in 1979.
The special field was Functional Nature of Language.
The Title of his Ph.D. Thesis was  "The Nature and Understanding of the Term Function and its Application to ESP".

References

Linguists
1933 births
2004 deaths
Academic staff of Kuwait University
Academic staff of Petra University
Alumni of Lancaster University
Cairo University alumni
Oregon State University faculty
People from Gaza City